Matthew Mead may refer to:

 Matthew Mead (poet) (born 1924), English poet
 Matthew Mead (politician) (1736–1816), member of the Connecticut House of Representatives
 Matthew Mead (minister) (1630–1699), English Independent minister
 Matt Mead (born 1962), American politician